Cooplacurripa River, a perennial river of the Manning River catchment, is located in the Northern Tablelands and Mid North Coast districts of New South Wales, Australia.

The river flows through the small locality of Cooplacurripa , after which it is named.

Course and features
Cooplacurripa River rises on the eastern slopes of the Great Dividing Range, southeast of Branga Plain, south of Walcha, and flows generally southeast by south, joined by two tributaries including the Mummel River and Walcrow River, before reaching its confluence with the Manning River, north of Gloucester. The river descends  over its  course.

Land adjacent to the Cooplacurripa River is principally used as grazing for beef cattle. The  cattle station, Cooplacurripa, situated on the Cooplacurripa River, was formerly owned by the Australian Agricultural Company.

Cooplacurripa River falls within the Northern NSW Trout Waters and includes the whole of the waters of the river, its creeks and tributaries upstream from its junction with, and including, the Mummel River.

See also 

 Rivers of New South Wales
 List of rivers of New South Wales (A–K)
 List of rivers of Australia

References

External links
 

Rivers of New South Wales
Northern Tablelands
Mid North Coast